Jeremy Edwards (born 23 December 1991) is an Australian field hockey player.

Edwards was born in Hobart, Tasmania, and made his senior international debut in a 2013 test series against Korea, in Perth, Western Australia.

In 2017, Edwards was elevated into the senior national team from the development squad, and has been a regular team member since.

In March 2018, Edwards was selected in the Australian national squad for the 2018 Commonwealth Games. The team won the gold medal, defeating New Zealand 2–0 in the final.

References

External links

1991 births
Living people
Australian male field hockey players
Commonwealth Games gold medallists for Australia
Commonwealth Games medallists in field hockey
Field hockey players at the 2018 Commonwealth Games
Sportsmen from Tasmania
Sportspeople from Hobart
Medallists at the 2018 Commonwealth Games